The Hatch bell foundry at Ulcombe, near Maidstone, in Kent, England, was operated by three generations of the Hatch family from 1581 or earlier until 1664. The bellfounders were based at nearby Broomfield from about 1587 until at least 1639. Joseph Hatch, bellfounder from 1602 to 1639, cast at least 155 bells, including "Bell Harry", after which the central tower of Canterbury Cathedral is named. Most Hatch bells were used in churches east of the River Medway in East Kent.

The bellfounders
The first recorded member of the Hatch family of bellfounders, named Thomas, received payment for work in the church at Cranbrook, Kent, in 1581 and 1593. He also made bells for the church at Lyminge in 1585 and for St Margaret's Church, Canterbury, and the churches at Bearsted, Langley and Margate in 1599. In 1887, according to J. C. L. Stahlschmidt, the only remaining bells made by Thomas Hatch were the treble bells at Langley and in St Margaret's Church, Canterbury, the latter being "cracked and useless". Stahlschmidt also wrote that a Bible belonging to the Hatch family gave Thomas Hatch's year of death as 1599, but he noted that a Thomas Hatch was recorded as a churchwarden for Broomfield, near Maidstone, in 1603. A bell cast in 1602 for the church at Waltham, Kent, bears Thomas Hatch's foundry stamp of a bell on a shield with the letters "T" and "H" on either side, but the bell also bears the legend , meaning 'Joseph Hatch made me', in reference to Thomas Hatch's son Joseph. Robert H. Goodsall, writing in 1970, noted that marriage bonds were provided by a "Thomas Hatch of Broomfield, bellfounder", in December 1607, for the marriage of one Joseph Hatch, also a bellfounder of Broomfield, and Jane Prowd of Canterbury: this Thomas Hatch could have been either Joseph Hatch's father or a brother of the same name.

The bell cast for Waltham in 1602 was probably the first made by Joseph Hatch, who otherwise used a foundry stamp of a circle containing three bells, for example on two bells cast in the same year for Egerton. In 1887 there remained 155 of his bells in Kent, and in 1969 there were 19 in Canterbury alone. While there were "probably a good many more of which no records have come to light", bells may also have been cast by him for buildings other than churches. Among Joseph Hatch's output was the bell known as "Bell Harry", dated 1635, after which the central tower of Canterbury Cathedral is known. Stahlschmidt wrote that, in 1887, there remained complete rings of bells by Joseph Hatch in the churches at Boughton Malherbe, Fordwich, High Halden, Waltham and Wouldham, all in Kent. He also observed that Joseph Hatch's bell-foundry business over 37 to 38 years "may fairly be described as enormous". In addition to the provisions of his written will, Joseph Hatch made oral bequests totalling £240 on 13 September 1639, the day before he died.

There was no explicit reference to the bell foundry in Joseph Hatch's will, and it may be that, while he was childless, it had already been passed on to his nephew William Hatch, who is described in the will as Joseph Hatch's servant. Stahlschmidt understood "servant" to mean "foreman", since William Hatch's initials occur on bells cast by Joseph Hatch from 1633. The business was disrupted in William Hatch's time by the English Civil War (1642–1651), and he is only known to have cast 25 bells, including rings at Lower Halstow and Minster-in-Sheppey. He died in 1664, and the bell foundry was discontinued.

The bell foundry

Stahlschmidt suspected that Thomas Hatch was first based in Canterbury, but, from late in the 16th century, the Hatch family of bellfounders was based at Roses Farm, Broomfield, near Maidstone, where Thomas Hatch may have first taken up residence in 1587. In 1889, W. Scott Robertson noted that the property of Roses Farm straddled the boundary between the parishes of Broomfield and Ulcombe: in a receipt for work on the bells at Birchington-on-Sea in 1606 Joseph Hatch described himself as "of Bromfeild", and he was buried in the churchyard at Broomfield, but he said in his will of 1639 that he was "of Ulcombe". Stahlschmidt considered it unlikely that the foundry was among the property bequeathed to Joseph Hatch's widow Jane, which included the main dwelling-house of Roses Farm, in Broomfield, and a smaller house adjacent, so it must have lain elsewhere. Bellfounding did not require dedicated buildings, and bells were sometimes cast in the vicinity of the churches for which they were made, but Stahlschmidt also reported a statement by James T. Hatch, a descendant of the same family, that the Hatch foundry was:

The Hatch bell foundry was thus located adjacent to the Weald, giving easy access to skilled metalworkers from the local iron industry and a plentiful supply of cheap charcoal, used to fuel the foundry. From there bells would have been carted to their destinations, some across the River Medway into West Kent, but most to East Kent. That the foundry produced items other than bells is indicated by a mortar held at Maidstone Museum, cast in bell metal, and bearing the initials "TH" and the year 1590.

References

Footnotes

Notes

Bibliography

1580s establishments in England
Bell foundries of the United Kingdom
History of Kent
Industrial history of England